The Chishui River (literally "Red Water River") is a river in China. It is a tributary of the Wei River. It is near the town of Chishui, in Hua County, under the jurisdiction of Weinan, in the northwestern province of Shaanxi.

On December 30, 2009, the Lanzhou–Zhengzhou–Changsha product oil pipeline that connects Lanzhou, Gansu with Zhengzhou, Henan burst, spilling  of diesel oil into the Chishui River. For details, see the article Yellow River oil spill.

References

Rivers of Shaanxi